The Elizabethton Twins were a Minor League Baseball team of the Appalachian League and a Rookie-level affiliate of the Minnesota Twins. They were located in Elizabethton, Tennessee, and were named for their major league affiliate. The team played its home games at Northeast Community Credit Union Ballpark, which opened in 1974.

Over 46 years of competition, the Twins played in 3,113 regular season games and compiled a 1,779–1,333–1 win–loss–tie record. They qualified for the postseason on 19 occasions, winning 16 division titles and 12 Appalachian League championships. Elizabethton won more league championships than any other team in Appalachian League history. They had a postseason record of 33–24. Combining all 3,170 regular season and postseason games, the Twins had an all-time record of 1,812–1,357–1.

History

Professional baseball was first played in Elizabethton, Tennessee, by the Elizabethton Betsy Red Sox in the Appalachian League in 1937. They remained in the league through 1942. The city's Appalachian League entry from 1945 to 1948 was called the Elizabethton Betsy Cubs. They were followed by the Elizabethton Betsy Local from 1949 to 1950 and the Elizabethton Phils in 1951.

Thirty-six years later, the Minnesota Twins placed the Elizabethton Twins in the Appalachian League as a Rookie-level affiliate. Elizabethton played its inaugural game on June 21, 1978, against the Kingsport Braves on the road at the ballpark on the campus of Dobyns-Bennett High School, losing 8–3. The Twins got their first win the next night, defeating Kingsport, also 8–3. Their Riverside Park home opener, scheduled for June 23 against the Bristol Tigers, was rained out. They played their first home game the next evening, losing to Bristol, 15–2. Elizabethton finished its inaugural season in second place with a 41–27–1 record.

Twins pitcher Rubio Malone tossed two no-hitters in 1978. He pitched the first on June 23 in the second game of a doubleheader against the Johnson City Cardinals in a seven-inning 8–1 win. The lone Johnson City run was scored in the first inning when Gotay Mills drew a walk, stole second, advanced to third on an outfield fly ball, and came home on a sacrifice fly. Malone's second no-hit game occurred nearly a month later on July 19, this time in front of a home audience. He held the Bluefield Orioles hitless for nine innings in the 6–0 win. The season was also successful for the Twins as they won their first Appalachian League championship in 1978 with a first-place 41–28 record. Manager Fred Waters, who had been leading the team since 1975, was selected for the Appalachian League Manager of the Year Award. Waters led Elizabethton to its second championship in 1984. They won the Southern Division title with a 40–29 record, then defeated the Pulaski Braves in a one-game playoff for the Appalachian League title. Waters won Manager of the Year honors, as he also had in 1981.

In 1987, Ray Smith replaced Waters as the Twins' manager after 12 years guiding the team. Smith would go on the become the winningest manager in Appalachian League history with 1,048 wins from 1987 to 1994 and 2002 to 2019. He would win a record seven Manager of the Year Awards and lead Elizabethton to nine league championships.

The first two championship seasons under Smith came back-to-back in 1989 and 1990. The 1989 team won the Southern Division and defeated Pulaski, 2–0, in the finals. The 1990 Twins set a franchise record with their 51–16 (.761) season and earned the league crown with a first-place finish. On August 26, 1991, Eddie Guardado pitched a no-hitter versus the Pulaski Braves, 5–0, at Joe O'Brien Field. They missed the playoffs that season but returned in 1992 and 1993 by virtue of winning the Southern Division title, only to lose in the championship finals. Smith was selected for four consecutive Manager of the Year Awards from 1989 to 1992. Another playoff drought occurred from 1994 to 1999, the longest in franchise history.

Over 20 years from 2000 to 2019, the Twins qualified for the postseason 15 times. Jeff Carter, the 2000 season's Manager of the Year, led Elizabethton to the Southern Division title and the franchise's fifth Appalachian League championship. After losing in the finals of 2001 under Manager of the Year Rudy Hernández, Ray Smith returned to lead the team in 2002. He guided the Twins to league titles in 2003, 2005, 2007, 2008, 2012, 2017, and 2018.
																										
On July 16, 2011, pitchers Tim Shibuya (7 IP), Garrett Jewel (1 IP), and Steven Gruver (1 IP) combined to no-hit the Greeneville Astros, 6–0, on the road.

The start of the 2020 season was postponed due to the COVID-19 pandemic before ultimately being cancelled on June 30. In conjunction with a contraction of Minor League Baseball beginning with the 2021 season, the Appalachian League was reorganized as a collegiate summer baseball league, and the Twins were replaced by the Elizabethton River Riders, a new franchise in the revamped league designed for rising college freshmen and sophomores.

Season-by-season results

Achievements

Awards

Eighteen players  won Appalachian League awards in recognition for their performance with the Twins. Eleven won Player of the Year Awards, while seven won the Pitcher of the Year Award. Four managers won the Manager of the Year Award, including Fred Waters, who was selected for the honor three times, and Ray Smith, who won the award a league-leading seven times. The team also won four Executive of the Year Awards, the Promotional Award of Excellence (2003 and 2014), and the Community Service Award (2017). Altogether, the Twins have won 37 Appalachian League awards.

Hall of Famers

One former member of the Twins has been elected to the National Baseball Hall of Fame. Outfielder Kirby Puckett, who was inducted in 2001, played 65 games with Elizabethton in 1982, his first professional season. He registered a .382 batting average with 105 hits and 35 RBI in addition to stealing 43 bases.

The Twins have also had five members inducted in the Appalachian League Hall of Fame.

Notable players
Among the Twins to make significant contributions to Major League Baseball teams after their time in Elizabethton are:

Jay Bell (1984)
Byron Buxton (2012)
Marty Cordova (1989)
Brian Dozier (2009)
Jim Eisenreich (1980)
Gary Gaetti (1979)
Rich Garcés (1988)
Matt Garza (2005)
Eddie Guardado (1991)
LaTroy Hawkins (1992)
Denny Hocking (1990)
Kent Hrbek (1979)
Max Kepler (2012)
Corey Koskie (1994)
Joe Mauer (2001)
Justin Morneau (2001)
Denny Neagle (1989)
Jesse Orosco (1978)
A. J. Pierzynski (1995)
Jorge Polanco (2012)
Kirby Puckett (1982)
Jeff Reed (1980)
Todd Ritchie (1990)
Miguel Sanó (2011)
Denard Span (2003)

References

Specific

General

External links
 Official website
 Statistics from Baseball-Reference

1974 establishments in Tennessee
2020 disestablishments in Tennessee
Defunct Appalachian League teams
Baseball teams established in 1974
Baseball teams disestablished in 2020
Elizabethton, Tennessee
Minnesota Twins minor league affiliates
Professional baseball teams in Tennessee